Matthew Caution is a retired American soccer player who played professionally in the USISL and the National Professional Soccer League.

Youth
In 1993, Caution graduated from Fort Zumwalt South High School.  He attended Southwest Missouri State University, playing on the men's soccer team from 1993 to 1997.  In 1994, he broke his leg while playing for the St. Louis Knights of the USISL during the collegiate off-season.  He lost his 1994 season with the Bears, but returned in 1995 and played through the 1997 season.  He holds the school record for points (125), goals (46) and assists (33).

Professional
On February 1, 1998, the Dallas Burn selected Caution in the third round (twenty-fifth overall) of the 1998 MLS College Draft.  On March 1, 1998, the Burn waived him during a pre-season roster reduction.  He signed with the Cincinnati Riverhawks of the USISL A-League where he played the 1998 and 1999 season.  In December 1999, he signed with the St. Louis Ambush of the National Professional Soccer League and played through the end of the 1999–2000 season.  In 2000, he played for the Indiana Blast.  In the fall of 2000, Caution signed with the Buffalo Blizzard of the NPSL.  The Blizzard folded at the end of the season and the Cleveland Crunch selected Caution in the Dispersal Draft.  The Crunch traded Caution to the St. Louis Steamers in exchange for Clint Regier in 2002.  When the Steamers announced they would sit out the 2002–2003 season, the league held a dispersal draft in August 2002 and the Philadelphia KiXX selected Caution.  On October 2, 2002, The KiXX then traded Caution to the Kansas City Comets for Matt Knowles.  Through all these trades, Caution did not suit up for any of these teams.  On October 2, 2003, Caution joined the Steamers as they re-entered the league.  In 2005, the California Cougars selected Caution in the MISL Expansion Draft.  In 2008, the Cougars traded Caution to the Orlando Sharks where Caution finished his career.

References

1974 births
Living people
American soccer players
Buffalo Blizzard players
California Cougars players
Cincinnati Riverhawks players
Cleveland Crunch (2001–2002 MISL) players
Indiana Blast players
Kansas City Comets (2001–2005 MISL) players
Major Indoor Soccer League (2001–2008) players
National Professional Soccer League (1984–2001) players
Orlando Sharks players
Soccer players from St. Louis
St. Louis Ambush (1992–2000) players
St. Louis Knights players
St. Louis Steamers (1998–2006) players
USISL players
A-League (1995–2004) players
FC Dallas draft picks
Association football forwards
Association football defenders